Kei may refer to:

People
 Kei (given name)
 Kei, Cantonese for Ji(姫)
 Kei, Cantonese for Qi(奇, 祁, 亓)
 Shō Kei (1700–1752), king of the Ryūkyū Kingdom
 Kei (singer) (born 1995), stage name of South Korean singer Kim Ji-yeon
 Princess Kei (Keihime) of Japan
 Kei Nishikori, Japanese professional tennis player

Automobiles
Kei car, a Japanese category of small automobiles
Suzuki Kei, a kei car produced by Suzuki between 1998 and 2009
Kei truck, a tiny RWD or 4WD pickup truck in Japan

In fiction
xxxHolic: Kei, the second season of the anime
Sir Kei or Sir Kay, a character in Arthurian legend
Kei, a character in Akira media 
Kei, a character in Dirty Pair media
Kei, a character in the Ape Escape universe
Kei, a fictional country in Twelve Kingdoms media
Kei, a character in Moon Child
Kei Nagase, a character in the Ace Combat universe
Kei, short for Keiichiro, a character in Wangan Midnight and Wangan Midnight Maximum Tune

KEI
Knowledge Ecology International, dealing with issues of intellectual property
Knowledge Economic Index, on knowledge economy
Keyword Effectiveness Index for a web site
Kinetic Energy Interceptor, former planned American missile defense program
Keithley Instruments, NYSE symbol

Other uses
Kei or Kai Islands, part of the Maluku Islands, Indonesia
Kei language
kei(x), one of the Kelvin functions
Kei school of Buddhist sculpture, Japan
Kei Rail, a South African rail project
Kei cricket team, South Africa
Kei, subgroup of the Kugyō in the Japanese pre-Meiji court
Great Kei River, in South Africa
a style in Japanese street fashion or a Japanese pop subculture, e.g. Visual kei
Kei (ritual gong), a Japanese musical instrument

See also
Kai (disambiguation)
KIE (disambiguation)